Three cutters of the United States Coast Guard have been named Willow

, a side paddle steamer originally built for service on the Mississippi River by the United States Lighthouse Service
USCGC Willow (WAGL/WLB-332), a former United States Army mine planter
, a Juniper-class seagoing buoy tender

United States Coast Guard ship names